The 2010–11 Texas A&M Aggies women's basketball team represented Texas A&M University in the 2010–2011 NCAA Division I women's basketball season. The Aggies were coached by Gary Blair. They won the 2011 NCAA Division I women's basketball tournament, the first national title for the school in women's basketball.

2011 NCAA Tournament
The team advanced through the tournament, defeating number one seeds Baylor and Stanford en route to the championship against Notre Dame. The Aggies won the game 76–70.

See also
 2011 NCAA Division I women's basketball tournament

References

External links
Official website

Texas A&M Aggies women's basketball seasons
Texas AandM
NCAA Division I women's basketball tournament Final Four seasons
NCAA Division I women's basketball tournament championship seasons
Texas AandM